The Roman Catholic Diocese of Suzhou is a diocese located in Suzhou, Jiangsu, China, under the Ecclesiastical Province of Nanjing. It covers the entire city of Suzhou.

History

Ming Dynasty  
The Italian Jesuit missionary Matteo Ricci introduced Catholicism into Jiangsu in 1599. He stayed in Suzhou in January of that year. In 1616, Giulio Aleni founded a church in Changshu, which is currently a city in the Suzhou Diocese.

Qing Dynasty 
In Suzhou city, Italian missionaries established the first Catholic church in 1649. By 1664, there were over 500 Catholics in Suzhou city and over 10,000 Catholics in Changshu.

In 1724, the Yongzheng Emperor proscribed Catholicism in China. His son, the Qianlong Emperor, continued the practice. In 1814, the Jiaqing Emperor further codified the prohibition of general Christianity. The Daoguang Emperor rescinded most anti-Christian edicts in 1844. 

In 1853, the Mission sui iuris of Suzhou was established. It later became a deanery under the Jiangnan Apostolic Prefecture in 1855.

Republic of China 
In 1922, the Deanery of Suzhou was included under the newly established Jiangsu Apostolic Prefecture, which changed its name to Nanjing Apostolic Prefecture in 1926. The Shanghai Apostolic Prefecture, which contained the Suzhou Deanery, was separated from the Nanjing Prefecture in 1933, and became a diocese in 1946. The Suzhou Deanery was elevated into a diocese and separated from the Shanghai Diocese on 9 June 1949.

People's Republic of China 
Upon the founding of the PRC, there were about 34 clergy members and 31,350 Catholics in the diocese. During the Cultural Revolution, many historical churches of the diocese were damaged. Church activities gradually resumed in the 1980s. In 1992, there were about 8 priests, 18 nuns, and 50,000 Catholics in the diocese.

Yushan Forum 
Since 2018, the diocese has been a co-sponsor of the Yushan Forum, according to the Bureau of Religious and Ethnic Affairs of Suzhou. The forum's topics of each time are listed below:

 October 2018: The Sinicization of Catholic Literature and Art
 January 2022, September 2022: Adherence to the Sinicization of Catholicism

Bishops 

The first bishop of Suzhou was Cardinal Ignatius Kung Pin-Mei. He was consecrated in 1949. Later he was arrested in 1955 and released in 1985. He left China for the United States in 1988 and died in 2000. Kung was named Cardinal in pectore by Pope John Paul II in 1979. His membership in the College of Cardinals was made public in 1991, after Kung left China.

According to the Chinese Province of the Jesuits, the auxiliary bishop Joseph Fan Zhongliang would have automatically succeeded as the bishop of Suzhou Diocese after Kung's death. Fan was secretly consecrated in 1985. However, he was not recognized by the Chinese government. He died in 2014.

Catholic Patriotic Association 

Ignatius Shen Chuming became the vicar general of Suzhou in 1956. He was elected bishop in 1958 and consecrated in 1959. He was a standing member of the national Catholic Patriotic Association (CPA) of China. The year of his death is uncertain: according to Catholic-Hierarchy.org, he died in 1966; according to the Committee of Ethnic and Religious Affairs of Jiangsu, he died in 1974.

Matthias Ma Longlin was elected and consecrated bishop in 1981. He later became the chair of the CPA of Suzhou. He died in 1999.

In 1999, the CPA appointed Joseph Xu Honggen as the bishop of Suzhou, and he later also received the appointment from the Holy See. In 2006, Xu was officially consecrated Bishop at the Cathedral of Our Lady of Seven Sorrows, Suzhou. In 2016, Pope Francis met Bishop Xu in Vatican City, making Xu the first ever mainland Chinese bishop to meet the Pope.

Churches 

According to Jiangsu's Catholic Patriotic Association (CPA), an organization affiliated with the Chinese united front, the diocese contains the following churches:

Suzhou Industrial Park 
 Suzhou Industrial Park Catholic Church, where the bishop's office is located.

Gusu 
 Cathedral of Our Lady of Seven Sorrows, also known as Yangjiaqiao Catholic Church
 Daxin Alley Catholic Church

Xiangcheng 
 Xiangcheng Catholic Church

Wujiang 
 Lili Catholic Church
 Shengze Catholic Church

Changshu 
 Tangjiao Catholic Church

Zhangjiagang 
 Houcheng Catholic Church
 Yangshe Catholic Church
 Luyuan Catholic Church

Kunshan 
 Xiaohengtang Catholic Church: upon its consecration on 2 May 2016, it was the tallest Catholic church in China.
 Lujia Catholic Church

Taicang 
 Loudong Catholic Church
 Zhangjing Catholic Church

See also 
 Ecclesiastical Province of Nanjing
 Catholicism in China

References

Citations

External links

 GCatholic.org
 Catholic Hierarchy
 UCAN Diocese Profile

Roman Catholic dioceses in China
Christian organizations established in 1949
Roman Catholic dioceses and prelatures established in the 20th century
Organizations based in Jiangsu
Religion in Suzhou
1949 establishments in China